The 1983 UK Championship (also known as the 1983 Coral UK Championship for sponsorship reasons) was a professional non-ranking snooker tournament that took place at the Guild Hall in Preston, England, between 21 November and 4 December 1983. This was the seventh edition of the UK Championship, the sixth staging of the competition in Preston, and the sixth UK Championship to be sponsored by Coral. The televised stages were shown on the BBC from 26 November through to the end of the championship.

Alex Higgins staged a dramatic comeback, recovering from 0–7 down to beat Steve Davis 16–15 in the final, to win his only UK Championship title. The highest break of the tournament was a 139 made by Tony Meo.

Prize fund
The breakdown of prize money for this year is shown below:
Winner: £12,000
Runner-up £6,500
Highest break: £1,000
Total: £60,000

Main draw

Last 32  Best of 17 frames

 Terry Griffiths 9–4 Dave Martin 

 Mike Hallett 9–4 Graham Miles 

 Joe Johnson 9–6 John Virgo 

 David Taylor 9–4 Neal Foulds 

 Tony Knowles 9–5 Tony Jones 

 Doug Mountjoy 9–2 Mike Watterson 

 Alex Higgins 9–6 Murdo MacLeod 

 Paul Medati 9–3 Dean Reynolds 

 Cliff Wilson 9–4 Rex Williams 

 Ray Reardon 9–7 Bob Harris 

 Dennis Taylor 9–6 Tommy Murphy 

 Jimmy White 9–1 Ian Black 

 John Spencer 9–7 John Dunning 

 Tony Meo 9–7 John Parrott 

 Willie Thorne 9–5 Mark Wildman 

 Steve Davis 9–1 Geoff Foulds

Final

Century breaks

 139  Tony Meo
 119  Joe Johnson
 119  Paul Medati
 113  Tony Knowles
 108  Steve Davis
 108  Jimmy White
 101  Ray Reardon

References

UK Championship (snooker)
UK Championship
UK Championship
UK Championship
UK Championship